The 1975 Champion Spark Plug 400 was a NASCAR Winston Cup Series race that took place on August 24, 1975, at Michigan International Speedway in Brooklyn, Michigan.

Programs were sold for this race at a price of $1.50 per copy ($ when adjusted for inflation). The cost of admission to this race was relatively cheap; children got in for US$5 ($ when adjusted for inflation) while adults got decent seats for US$10 ($ when adjusted for inflation).

This was the first Cup race at Michigan International Speedway to have a corporate title sponsor. In all prior years, the August Michigan Cup race had been called the Yankee 400.

Background
Groundbreaking took place on September 28, 1967. Over  of dirt were moved to form the D-shaped oval. The track opened in 1968 with a total capacity of 25,000 seats. The track was originally built and owned by Lawrence H. LoPatin, a Detroit-area land developer who built the speedway at an estimated cost of $4–6 million. Financing was arranged by Thomas W Itin. Its first race took place on Sunday, October 13, 1968, with the running of the USAC 250 mile Championship Car Race won by Ronnie Bucknum.

Race report
Two hundred laps were completed in three hours and forty-five seconds on the paved oval track spanning . All of the 36 drivers who qualified for this race were born in the United States of America. Henley Gray started 374 races in Cup, but this is the only race where he led laps - two of them right after Coo Coo Marlin's wreck.

Six yellow flags slowed the race for 63 laps while the lead changed 25 times among twelve drivers. Richard Petty would defeat David Pearson by a distance of five feet as the lead changed four times between them in the final four laps in front of 47,000 audience members. This race was considered to be one of MRN's finest broadcasts; with interesting commentary during a long rain delay.

Pearson would win the pole position with a speed of  while the average speed of the race would be . Even with David Pearson finishing in second place, he managed to keep his finishing streak going with victories at the 1976 Cam 2 Motor Oil 400 and the 1976 Champion Spark Plug 400.

Jackie Rogers would receive the last-place finish for owner Lou Viglione and his 1975 Chevrolet team; he would match his career-best qualifying effort with a ninth-place starting spot but the motor on his #60 Chevrolet failed in the opening laps. The race saw A. J. Foyt lead sixty-eight laps before falling out with engine failure after 117 laps.  Independent driver David Sisco led 28 laps en route to finishing 11th.

Prize winnings would range from $15,140 for the winner ($ when adjusted for inflation) to $700 for the last-place finisher ($ when adjusted for inflation). There were 36 cars on the official racing grid; most of them were Chevrolets. Terry Bivins would make his NASCAR debut in this race. Maynard Troyer would record his only top ten on his career. Richard Petty would keep his championship lead after this race. However, Dave Marcis would only be 573 points behind (despite not winning a race up to this point).

Qualifying

Finishing order
Section reference:

Timeline
Section reference:
 Start: David Pearson was leading the starting grid as the first official lap commenced.
 Lap 6: Jackie Roberts fell out with engine failure.
 Lap 20: Coo Coo Marlin fell out with engine failure, causing a lengthy caution for repairs.
 Lap 48: Benny Parsons fell out with engine failure.
 Lap 58: Ed Negre fell out with engine failure.
 Lap 61: Earle Canavan fell out with engine failure.
 Lap 67: Caution due to rain, ended on lap 87.
 Lap 97: Richard Childress fell out with engine failure.
 Lap 117: A. J. Foyt fell out with engine failure.
 Lap 119: Carl Adams fell out with engine failure.
 Lap 132: J. D. McDuffie fell out with engine failure.
 Lap 142: The rear end came off of Henley Gray's vehicle in an unsafe manner.
 Lap 183: Richie Panch fell out with engine failure.
 Lap 192: Caution due to Cale Yarborough and Dave Marcis spinning into the frontstretch, ended on lap 195.
 Finish: Richard Petty was officially declared the winner of the event.

Standings after the race

References

Champion Spark Plug 400
Champion Spark Plug 400
NASCAR races at Michigan International Speedway